Big Shiny Spears is the debut studio album of Iron Lung Corp, released on March 25, 1997, by Re-Constriction Records.

Reception
Aiding & Abetting gave Big Shiny Spears a mixed review, praising the production but noting that "this sort of music works much better at a higher speed, and that's all there is to it" and "there's not much substance behind the great sound." The album was similarly received by Larry Dean Miles at Black Monday, who gave the album a mixed review but praised Nitzer Ebb's "Join in the Murderous Chant" and said "ILC have done justice here, creating another masterpiece from the parts of previous, god-like songs" Scott Hefflon of Lollipop Magazine compared the material favorably to Cubanate, saying "a few dull-as-a-dead-fuck instrumentals ensure their searching artiste credentials, and the White Zombified vocals ensure that the kids’ll just love it." A critic at Sonic Boom agreed, saying "the album appears very lopsided in places, and should probably be considered as a new Acumen release rather than a collaboration effort." However, they noted that "there are plenty of the usual tongue in cheek lyrical wonderments as well as a healthy dose of chunky guitars to thrill the headbanger in you."

Track listing

Personnel
Adapted from the Big Shiny Spears liner notes.

Iron Lung Corp
 Jamie Duffy (as Kidd Vicious) – guitar, recording, mixing
 Alex Eller (as Justin Tate) – vocals
 Gregory A. Lopez (as Nez Pierce) – bass guitar, Moog synthesizer (7)
 Brian McGarvey (as Brian Justice) – guitar
 Daniel Neet – vocals
 Will Nivens (as Lex) – electronics
 Ethan Novak (as Ethan Alien) – drums, guitar
 Jason Novak (as Jawson) – electronics, guitar, vocals, editing

Additional musicians
 Paul Dillon – guitar (11)
 Stella Katsoudas – additional vocals (5)
 Zlatko Hukic – electronics (12), assistant engineering

Production and design
 Jason Bacher – assistant engineering
 Jay Fisher (as Jay You Asshole) – assistant engineering
 Trey Fratt – assistant engineering
 Dirk Frederick – illustrations
 Matt Gibson (as Sour Matt) – assistant engineering
 Iron Lung Corp – production
 Mama Kidd – photography
 Mangus – photography
 Esther Nevarez (as Esther Bunny) – assistant engineering
 Solaris – cover art
 Mike Tholen – mastering
 Ed Tinley (as Apple Ed) – assistant engineering
 Whos Fred – assistant engineering

Release history

References

External links 
 

1997 debut albums
Iron Lung Corp albums
Re-Constriction Records albums